Miles City is an unincorporated community in Collier County, Florida, United States, located near the intersection of the Alligator Alley portion of Interstate 75 and State Road 29. The community is part of the Naples–Marco Island Metropolitan Statistical Area. The name came from Miles Collier, son of area land owner Barron Collier.

Miles City opened in the 1920s and was home to dozens of families who worked at the Roskey Packing Plant. It was also a former stop on the Atlantic Coast Line Railroad (Harrisburg-Everglades City branch).

Roads
 Alligator Alley (Interstate 75)
 Florida State Road 29

See also
 Miles City, Montana

References

Unincorporated communities in Collier County, Florida
Unincorporated communities in Florida
1920s establishments in Florida
Populated places established in the 1920s